"Strange Little Girl" is a song by the Stranglers, originally written in 1974 and re-recorded and released in the UK in 1982 as their last single while signed to Liberty Records (part of EMI). By the time of release, the band had already decided to leave the label for Epic Records, and this last single was part of the severance deal, along with the compilation album, The Collection 1977–1982.

Recording and release
The band showed their talent for mischief in releasing "Strange Little Girl" as their last single on the label when they revealed that it had originally been written in 1974, and submitted to EMI years before the band had a recording contract. EMI had rejected the band on the basis of that demo. "Strange Little Girl" went on to peak at No. 7 in the UK Singles Chart in August 1982.

The music video featured the band and a group of girl punks in London, and was shot around Cambridge Circus and Liverpool Street.

Track listing
 Side A – "Strange Little Girl" – 2:40
 Side B – "Cruel Garden" – 2:17

Tori Amos version
The version by Tori Amos, was released as the first and only single from her 2001 album Strange Little Girls.

Track listing
German single

 "Strange Little Girl" – 3:50
 "After All" – 4:42
 "Only Women Bleed" – 3:34

Song information
The single for "Strange Little Girl" was never released outside of Germany. Unlike some of her other previously rare tracks, the two B-sides for the single ("Only Women Bleed" and "After All") were not included on the Tori Amos compilation A Piano: The Collection, and have yet to appear on any other Tori Amos release to date.

Music video
A music video was filmed for "Strange Little Girl". However, it has never been released officially (this is one of two videos that were excluded from her music video collection, Fade to Red, the other being "Glory of the '80s").

The video takes place in a sort of crop field, with a young girl being chased by a wolf. Between the shots of the crops, the girl suddenly becomes Amos (this age shift goes back and forth throughout the video). After running, she discovers a house, in which she takes refuge. The wolf tries to get inside, but it cannot—in fact, at one point, the wolf is almost as large as the house. Conversely, near the end of the video, the wolf shrinks enough to be able to squeeze under the door. Amos then takes the wolf in her hand.

References

The Stranglers songs
Tori Amos songs
1982 singles
2001 singles
1982 songs
Liberty Records singles
Songs written by Dave Greenfield
Songs written by Hans Wärmling
Songs written by Hugh Cornwell
Songs written by Jean-Jacques Burnel
Songs written by Jet Black
Music videos directed by David Slade